This is a list of notable people from North Malabar, a historical and cultural area including the former French exclaves of Pondicherry. North Malabar is now administratively at the northern end of Kerala, India.

 Pazhassi Raja (1753–1805), freedom fighter and prince regent of Kottayam princely state
 Cherusseri Namboothiri (c.1375–c.1475), poet
 Aromal Chekavar, Legendary hero and warrior from the 12th century.
 Thacholi Othenan, legendary hero from the 1600's
 00s
 Unniyarcha -12th Century warrior
 Chandu Chekavar -12th Century Warrior
 A. K. Gopalan (1904–1977), politician, communist leader, MP
 K. Kelappan (1889–1971), social reformer and journalist
 E. K. Nayanar (1919–2004), politician, communist leader and Chief Minister of Kerala
 K. P. R. Gopalan (1906–1997), politician. Naxalite communist leader and MPA
 M. V. Raghavan (1933–2014), politician, communist leader and MPA
 Sankaran Moopan 18th century an ancient chief commander of pazhassi raja
 Karayi Krishnan Gurukkal 19th Century scholar.
 Dewan E.K Krishnan (1841-1907) 19th century deputy collector.
 Janaki Ammal (1897-1984) cytogenetics and phytogeography
 Meenakshi Amma kalaripayattu guru and padmasree.
Choorayi Kanaran (1812-1876)  first deputy collector of India, 19th century. 
Rao Sahib Ayyathan Gopalan (1863-1948), social reformer
Ayyathan Janaki Ammal (1881-1945) first female doctor in kerala
I. K. Kumaran (1903-1999) 20th century mahe freedom fighter.
Vagbhatananda (1885-1939) hindu social reformer 
Keeleri Kunhikannan (1858-1939) martial art gurukkal and cercus experter
S. K. Pottekkatt (1913-1982) an malayalam literature
Mithavaadi Krishnan social reformer.
Potheri Kunjambu Vakil (1857-1919) social reformer, writer, royal family loyer
Muliyil Krishnan (1845-1901) written.
Narikkuni Unnirikutty Vaidyar (1849-1909) 19th century scholar
Ponnapuramkottayil Kelu Moopan 17th century warrior
 K. Karunakaran (1918–2010), politician, congress leader and Chief Minister of Kerala
 E. Ahmed (1938-2017), politician, Muslim League leader and Central Cabinet Minister
 Moorkoth Kumaran (1874–1941), teacher and short-story writer
 Moorkoth Ramunni (1915–2009), pilot and bureaucrat
 Moorkoth Kunhappa (1905–1993), journalist, editor, novelist
 M. N. Nambiar (1919–2008), film actor and spiritual leader
 Verghese Kurien (1921–2012), social entrepreneur and founder of Amul
 Sreenivasan (born 1956), film actor, screenwriter, director, and producer
 Kannur Rajan (1949–1995), music composer 
 Kuroolli Chekon, 20th century Kadathanad robinhood.
 Kaithapram Damodaran Namboothiri (born 1950), lyricist, music director, actor, singer, screenwriter, and performer of carnatic music
 Gireesh Puthenchery (1961–2010), lyricist and screenwriter
 Vineeth (born 1969), film actor and classical dancer
 K. Raghavan (1913–2013), music composer
 A. T. Ummer (1933-2001), music composer
 Vengayil Kunhiraman Nayanar (1861-1914), journalist, writer, landowner
 Vijay K. Nambiar (born 1943), diplomat 
 O. M. Nambiar (1932-2021), athletics coach and winner of the Dronacharya award
 Lt. General Satish Nambiar (born 1936), general and commander of the UNPROFOR force in the former Yugoslavia 1992-93
 Pinarayi Vijayan (born 1944), politician, communist leader, MPA, Chief Minister of Kerala
 Kalingalmadom Rarichan Moopan - Social Leader.
 Kodiyeri Balakrishnan (born 1953), politician, communist leader, MPA
 Sukumar Azhikode (1926–2012), writer philosopher
 M. Night Shyamalan (born 1970), film director, screenwriter, and producer
 M. Mukundan (born 1942), writer, social activist
 Kavya Madhavan (born 1984), film actress
 Samvrutha Sunil (born 1986), film actress
 Captain C. P. Krishnan Nair (1922–2014), businessman, hotelier

References

Lists of people from Kerala